Mathieu Cailler is an author whose poetry and prose have been widely featured in numerous national and international publications; including the Los Angeles Times and The Saturday Evening Post. He is a graduate of the Vermont College of Fine Arts; and is the winner of a Short Story America Prize and a Shakespeare Award. He is the author of the short-story collection, Loss Angeles (Short Story America Press), which has been honored by the Hollywood, New York, London, Paris, Best Book, and International Book Awards; the poetry collection, May I Have This Dance? (About Editions), winner of the 2017 New England Book Festival Poetry Prize; and the children’s book, The (Underappreciated) Life of Humphrey Hawley (About Editions), which has been nominated for the Caldecott Medal and the Newbery Award, among other notable prizes. His most recent books are the poetry collection, Catacombs of the Heart (Spartan Press) and Hi, I’m Night (Olympia), a children’s book. His first novel, Heaven and Other Zip Codes will be published by Open Books in late 2020.

Life
Mathieu Cailler was born in Long Beach, California, United States, and grew up in Los Angeles, California.

He attended Occidental College and Vermont College of Fine Arts, where he received an MFA in creative writing.

His debut collection of short stories, Loss Angeles, contained 15 stories all informed by loss, and was published in 2015.

Books

References

External links
 Official website
 Online Dating, a poem by Mathieu Cailler
 

Living people
1984 births
American male poets
American male short story writers
Vermont College of Fine Arts alumni
21st-century American short story writers
21st-century American poets
American people of French descent
Occidental College alumni
Writers from Long Beach, California
21st-century American male writers